Joseph Russell Knowland (August 5, 1873 –  February 1, 1966) was an American politician and newspaper publisher. He served as a member of the United States House of Representatives from California and was owner, editor and publisher of the Oakland Tribune. He was the father of United States Senator William F. Knowland.

Early life
Knowland was born in Alameda, California on August 5, 1873, the son of Joseph Knowland (1833–1912) and Hannah Bailey Russell (1832–1921). His siblings included two sisters, Sadie (1864–1905) and Lucille (1870–1926), and a brother, Hollis, who died in infancy. Knowland attended Alameda Park Street Primary School and Hopkins Academy, and graduated from the University of the Pacific in 1895.

Start of career
After college, Knowland joined his father's wholesale lumber and shipping business. His business career proved successful, and ventures in which Knowland participated included: Gardiner Mill Company (president); Kennedy Mine & Milling Company (director); Alameda National Bank (director); and Union Savings Bank of Oakland (director).

He was also active in several fraternal and civic organizations, to include the Freemasons, Shriners, Elks, Modern Woodmen of America, Native Sons of the Golden West, and California Landmarks League. Knowland's memberships also included the California Centennials Council, California Historical Society, California Chamber of Commerce, California State Automobile Association, Oakland Chamber of Commerce, Oakland Community Chest, Mills College Board of Trustees, Oakland National Horse Show, and Athens Athletic Club.

Political career

California Assembly
Knowland joined the Alameda Good Government Club in early 1895. In 1896, he was appointed to the Alameda Library Board of Trustees. In 1898, he was a successful Republican candidate  for the California State Assembly. He was reelected in 1900, and served from 1899 to 1903. During his Assembly career, Knowland chaired the Assembly committee that investigated the corruption in the San Francisco police. His efforts resulted in passage of a law prohibiting the human trafficking of Chinese women.

California Senate
In 1902, Knowland was elected to the California State Senate. He served until resigning in order to take the seat in the United States House of Representatives to which he had been elected in 1904. During Knowland's Senate term, he was chairman of the body's committee on banking.

Member of Congress
In 1904, Knowland was elected to Congress in a special election, filling the vacancy caused by the resignation of Victor H. Metcalf. He was reelected to five full terms and served from September 24, 1904 to March 3, 1915. His district included the U.S. Army's Benicia Arsenal and the U.S. Naval Shipyard at Mare Island, so Knowland had a keen interest in the military. As a congressman, he worked to obtain approval for construction of Navy capital ships in California and for a two-ocean fleet. In addition, Knowland advocated for American ships to use the Panama Canal toll free.

Knowland sought to succeed George C. Perkins in the U.S. Senate. In 1914, he won the Republican primary over Samuel M. Shortridge. However, he was unsuccessful in the general election, a three-way race with Francis J. Heney of the Progressive Party and the winner, James D. Phelan, Democrat.

The Oakland Tribune
Knowland became owner, editor, president and publisher of The Oakland Tribune on 3 November 1915. He wrote, "It is perfectly understood that what it [the Tribune] does, rather than what it promises, will determine the true measure of its worth; and with this understanding, the Tribune, under its new control, girds to its work." Many years and court battles with Hermina Peralta Dargie (widow of owner William E. Dargie) passed before Knowland had full control of the Tribune. Knowland built the Tribune Tower, a city landmark at 13th and Franklin Streets. He had a great interest in restoring the California Missions. This had begun in 1903, with Mission San Antonio De Padua. He was a historical advisor during the 1927 California State Park Survey.

In 1932, Knowland went to Washington and persuaded President Herbert Hoover and the Reconstruction Finance Corporation to advance $62 million for the completion of the San Francisco–Oakland Bay Bridge. He created, with Bruno Albert Forsterer and Joseph Blum, the Franklin Investment Company in 1936 (later the Franklin Credit Union). In 1937, he attained the status of 33rd Degree Mason, Ancient Accepted Scottish Rite. Knowland was a member of the Finance Committee of the Golden Gate International Exposition of 1939-1940. In 1941, he authored California: A Landmark History. He was the political mentor of Earl Warren; from assistant Oakland City Attorney to Chief Justice of the United States Supreme Court.

Knowland served on the California State Park Commission from 1934 to 1960 and was chairman from 1938 to 1960. He was appointed by Governor Earl Warren as chairman of the California Centennial Commission from 1948 to 1950. Knowland was honored on September 9, 1951 by the City of Oakland and the State of California, with Joseph Knowland State Arboretum and Park in Oakland. He served as chairman of the Oakland Centennial in 1952, and the Alameda County Centennial in 1953.

Knowland was proud of the political career of his son, United States Senator William F. Knowland from 1945 to 1959, who served as Senate Majority Leader from 1953 to 1955 and Senate Minority Leader from 1955 to 1959. The only mistake that he felt that his son made was his 1958 run and defeat for Governor of California.

He attended his first Republican National Convention in 1904. He attended the GOP conventions as a delegate or newspaperman until 1964. Oakland became a one-newspaper city on September 1, 1950, when William Randolph Hearst closed his Oakland Post-Enquirer. The Oakland Tribune's radio station KLX began operation in 1921 and would be on the air until its sale in 1959.

Personal life
Knowland met Elinor (Ellie) J. Fife (1873–1908) of Tacoma, Washington while they were students at University of the Pacific. Ellie was the daughter of Tacoma businessman W. H. Fife. Knowland and Ellie were married on April 2, 1894 in Tacoma. Three children were born to this union: Elinor Knowland Lion (1895–1978); Joseph Russell "Russ" Knowland, Jr. (1901–1961); and US Senator William F. Knowland (1908–1974). Shortly after the birth of William F. Knowland, Ellie Knowland died.

Knowland, a young widower with children, met Emelyn S. West (1884–1950) of West Lynne, Virginia. On September 28, 1909 they were wed in Chicago, Illinois. Emelyn Knowland was a loving stepmother and active in her husband's social and political life. Emelyn died July 14, 1950, during the California Centennial. Knowland's third wife, Clarice E. "Cookie" Cook (1902–1979), was an officer of the Native Daughters of the Golden West. Knowland and Cook were married on April 6, 1952 in Stockton, California. A shared interest in California history made a happy marriage for Knowland's twilight years. Knowland remained active in his old age and came each day to the Tribune.

Death
On February 1, 1966, Joseph Russell Knowland died at 4:25 p.m. in his 25 Seaview Avenue residence in Piedmont. His wife Clarice with granddaughters, Emelyn K. Jewett and Josephine L. Church, were at his bedside.

On February 2, 1966, the Tribune's headline was "Joseph R. Knowland Dead". Joseph R. Knowland was praised by Republicans and Democrats. California Governor Edmund G. Pat Brown said, "Knowland, strongly believed in California...the State he loved so well." The public funeral of J.R. Knowland was held at the First Methodist Church and the private family service at Mountain View Cemetery Chapel in Oakland. He was cremated at Mountain View Cemetery Crematory and is inurned with his third wife, Clarice, in  Serenity Section, Tier N-4, Number 3 at the Chapel of Memories columbarium in Oakland, California.

Fraternal organizations

 Native Sons of the Golden West
 Masons
 Shriners
 Knights Templar
 Ancient Arabic Order of Nobles of the Mystic Shrine
 Bohemian Club
 Pacific Union Club
 Benevolent & Protective Order of Elks—Oakland # 171
 Athens Athletic Club
 Athenian Nile Club
 California Historical Society
 Oakland and Alameda County Pioneers
 Claremont Country Club
 Associated Press
 California Press Association's Newspaper Hall of Fame

Board memberships

 American Trust Company
 Marchant Calculating Machine Company
 Oakland Title Insurance and Guaranty Company
 California State Automobile Association
 American Automobile Association
 Associated Press
 California State Park Commission
 California State Chamber of Commerce

References

Sources
 California Blue Book. Sacramento: State Printing Office, 1909.
 Gothberg, John A. "The Local Influence of Joseph R. Knowland's Oakland Tribune". Minneapolis Journalism Quarterly - 45, (Autumn 1968):487-95.
 Knowland, Joseph R. California: A Landmark History. Oakland: Tribune Press, 1941.
 Wyatt, Daniel E. Joseph R. Knowland: The Political Years 1899-1915. San Francisco, D.Wyatt, 1982.
 Joseph R. Knowland Papers, Bancroft Library, University of California, Berkeley.

External links

 
 Knowland Family at Political Graveyard
 “Selections from Oakland Tribune Archives,” by Annalee Allen, Arcadia Publishing 2006
  Finding Aid to the Joseph R. Knowland Papers, 1857-1966, bulk 1905-1960, The Bancroft Library
 Join California Joseph R. Knowland

1873 births
1966 deaths
Politicians from Alameda, California
Republican Party California state senators
Republican Party members of the California State Assembly
Republican Party members of the United States House of Representatives from California
Knowland family
20th-century American newspaper publishers (people)